Mendrisio railway station is a railway station in the Swiss canton of Ticino and municipality of Mendrisio. The station is on the Swiss Federal Railways Gotthard railway, between Lugano and Chiasso, and is also the junction for the Mendrisio–Varese line, formerly freight-only, but which was rebuilt as an international connection to Varese.

Services 
 the following services stop at Mendrisio:

References

External links 
 
 

Railway stations in Ticino
Swiss Federal Railways stations
Mendrisio
Railway stations in Switzerland opened in 1874